The red-banded hairstreak (Calycopis cecrops) is a butterfly native to the southeastern United States. It feeds on fallen leaves of sumac species and other trees. It lives near coastal areas.

Its genome was sequenced in 2016. It has a false "head" that helps it avoid predators. In a 2012 experiment, C. cecrops was exposed to a jumping spider, Phidippus pulcherrimus, which researchers found to be a "very efficient strategy in deflecting attacks."

References

External links

Butterflies & Moths of North America

Calycopis
Butterflies of North America
Butterflies described in 1793